Prospect House, known also as just Prospect, is a historic house on the Princeton University campus in Princeton, Mercer County, New Jersey, United States.  Built in 1851, it is a fine example of the work of architect John Notman who helped popularize Italianate architecture in America.  Notable residents include Woodrow Wilson during his tenure as president of the university.  The building now serves as a faculty club.  It was designated a National Historic Landmark in 1985 for its architecture and historic associations.

Description and history
Prospect House stands on the Princeton University campus, between the Princeton University Art Museum and Washington Street. The house is a two-story stone structure, built out of rustically cut sandstone, with a three-story tower at one end, and a single-story service wing. The roofs are low-pitch hip roofs, with broad eaves decorated with brackets. The main facade has a central stone porte-cochere topped by a balustrade. Flanking this are slightly projecting bays, featuring matching second-story balconies. A modern dining room addition, designed by Warren Platner, extends to the rear.

Prospect House was built in 1851-52 for Thomas Fuller Potter.  Prior to its construction, the site had been that of a farm whose house had hosted George Washington both during and after the American Revolutionary War.  The house was designed by John Notman, a Scottish architect based in Philadelphia who is credited with introducing the Italianate style of architecture to the United States.

In 1878, it was acquired by brothers Alexander and Robert Stuart, who gave it to the College of New Jersey, which became Princeton University and served as the house of the school president.  Woodrow Wilson, the third Princeton president to live here, was resident from 1902 to 1911, when he became Governor of New Jersey en route to becoming President of the United States.

On February 10, 1913, Thomas J. Preston Jr., a professor of archeology at Princeton University, married Frances Folsom Cleveland, the widow of President Grover Cleveland at the Prospect House.

In 1968, the president's official residence was moved to another house, and Prospect House was adapted for use as a private clubhouse for the university faculty.

It was designated a U.S. National Historic Landmark in 1985.

Gallery

See also 
 List of National Historic Landmarks in New Jersey
 National Register of Historic Places listings in Mercer County, New Jersey

References

Prospect House History

External links

Princeton University: Prospect House

National Historic Landmarks in New Jersey
Houses in Princeton, New Jersey
Houses completed in 1851
Princeton University buildings
National Register of Historic Places in Mercer County, New Jersey
1851 establishments in New Jersey
Historic district contributing properties in Mercer County, New Jersey